Shah Alam II (Persian: شاه عالم دوم) (25 June 1728 – 19 November 1806), also known by his birth name Ali Gohar (or Ali Gauhar), was the seventeenth Mughal Emperor and the son of Alamgir II. Shah Alam II became the emperor of a crumbling Mughal Empire. His power was so depleted during his reign that it led to a saying in the Persian language, Sultanat-e-Shah Alam, Az Dilli ta Palam, meaning, 'The empire of Shah Alam is from Delhi to Palam', Palam being a suburb of Delhi.

Shah Alam faced many invasions, mainly by the Emir of Afghanistan, Ahmed Shah Abdali, which led to the Third Battle of Panipat between the Maratha Empire, who maintained suzerainty over Mughal affairs in Delhi and the Afghans led by Abdali. In 1760, the invading forces of Abdali were driven away by the Marathas, led by Sadashivrao Bhau, who deposed Shah Jahan III, the puppet Mughal emperor of Imad-ul-Mulk, and installed Shah Alam II as the rightful emperor (17601772).

Shah Alam II was considered the only and rightful emperor, but he was unable to return to Delhi until 1772, under the protection of the Maratha general Mahadaji Shinde. He also fought against the East India Company at the Battle of Buxar.  In 1788, when he was a prisoner of Ghulam Qadir, he was blinded.

Shah Alam II authored his own Diwan of poems and was known by the pen-name Aftab. His poems were guided, compiled and collected by Mirza Fakhir Makin.

Shah Alam also penned famous book Ajaib-ul-Qasas which is considered one of the earliest and prominent book of prose in Urdu.

Early life
Ali Gohar was born to Shahzada (Prince) Aziz-ud-Din, son of the deposed Mughal Emperor Jahandar Shah, on 25 June 1728. Alongside his father, he grew up in semi-captivity in the Salatin quarters of the Red Fort. However, unlike the majority of Mughal princes growing up in similar circumstances, he is not recorded to have become a decadent prince by the time his father became emperor, and therefore was naturally given high appointments in the course of his father's reign.

Upon his father's accession, he became the Wali al-Ahd (Crown Prince) of the empire, and became his father's principal agent, though almost all power lay in the Wazir Imad-ul-Mulk's hand. His quarrels with that amir, and fear for his own life, caused him to flee from Delhi in 1758.

Escape from Delhi
Prince Ali Gauhar, afterwards Emperor Shah Alam II, had been the heir apparent of his father Alamgir II. Prince Ali Gauhar's father had been appointed Mughal Emperor by Vizier Imad-ul-Mulk and Maratha Peshwa's cousin Sadashivrao Bhau.

Prince Ali Gauhar organized a militia and made a daring escape from Delhi. He appeared in the Eastern Subah in 1759, hoping to strengthen his position by attempting to regaining control over Bengal, Bihar and Odisha.

Very soon however, Najib-ud-Daula forced the usurper Imad-ul-Mulk to flee from the capital by gathering a large Mughal Army outside Delhi. He used the army to depose the recreant Shah Jahan III. Najib-ud-Daula and Muslim nobles then planned to defeat the Marathas by maintaining correspondence with the powerful Ahmad Shah Durrani. After Durrani decisively defeated the Marathas, he nominated Ali Gauhar as the emperor under the name Shah Alam II.

Bengal War

In 1760, after Shah Alam's militia gaining control over pockets in Bengal, Bihar and parts of Odisha, Prince Ali Gauhar and his Mughal Army of 30,000 intended to overthrow Mir Jafar and Imad-ul-Mulk after they tried to capture or kill him by advancing towards Awadh and Patna in 1759. But the conflict soon involved the intervention of the assertive East India Company.

The Mughals clearly intended to recapture their breakaway Eastern Subah led by Prince Ali Gauhar, who was accompanied by a Militia consisting of persons like Muhammad Quli Khan, Kadim Husein, Kamgar Khan, Hidayat Ali, Mir Afzal and Ghulam Husain Tabatabai. Their forces were reinforced by the forces of Shuja-ud-Daula, Najib-ud-Daula and Ahmad Khan Bangash. The Mughals were also joined by Jean Law and 200 Frenchmen and waged a campaign against the British during the Seven Years' War.

Prince Ali Gauhar successfully advanced as far as Patna, which he later besieged with a combined army of over 40,000 in order to capture or kill Ramnarian a sworn enemy of the Mughals. Mir Jafar was in terror at the near demise of his cohort and sent his own son Miran to relieve Ramnarian and retake Patna. Mir Jafar also implored the aid of Robert Clive, but it was Major John Caillaud, who dispersed Prince Ali Gauhar's army in 1761 after four major battles including Battle of Patna, Battle of Sirpur, Battle of Birpur and Battle of Siwan.

After negotiations assuring peace Shah Alam II was escorted by the British to meet Mir Qasim the new Nawab of Bengal, who was nominated after the sudden death of Miran. Mir Qasim soon had the Mughal Emperor's investiture as Subedar of Bengal, Bihar and Odisha, and agreed to pay an annual revenue of 2.4 million dam. Shah Alam II then retreated to Allahabad was protected by the Shuja-ud-Daula, Nawab of Awadh from 1761 until 1764. Meanwhile, Mir Qasim's relations with the East India company began to worsen. He initiated reforms that withdrew the tax exemption enjoyed by the East India Company, he also ousted Ramnarian a sworn enemy of the Mughal Empire and created Firelock manufacturing factories at Patna with the sole purpose of giving advantage to the newly reformed Mughal Army.

Angered by these developments the East India Company sought his ouster. Court intrigues encouraged by the East India Company forced Mir Qasim to leave Bengal, Bihar and Odisha. Mir Qasim on his part encouraged Shuja-ud-Daula the Nawab of Awadh and Shah Alam II to engage the British.

Acknowledged emperor

Shah Alam II was acknowledged emperor by the Durrani Empire. His declared reign extended to the 24 Parganas of the Sundarbans, Mir Qasim, Nawabs of Bengal and Murshidabad (and Bihar),Raja of Banares, Nizam of Hyderabad, Nawab of Ghazipur, Sahib of Punjab, Hyder Ali's Mysore, Nawab of Kadapa and Nawab of Kurnool, Nawab of the Carnatic of Arcot and Nellore, Nawab of Junagarh, Rohilkhand of Lower Doab, Rohilkhand of Upper Doab, and Nawab of Bhawalpur.

Battle of Buxar

The Battle of Buxar was fought on 22 October 1764 between the combined armies of Mir Qasim, the Nawab of Bengal; Shuja-ud-Daula the Nawab of Awadh; the Mughal Emperor Shah Alam II and the forces under the command of the East India Company led by Hector Munro. The battle fought at Buxar, a town located on the bank of the Ganges river then within the territory of Bengal, was a decisive victory for the East India Company.

Diwani rights
Soon after the Battle of Buxar, Shah Alam II, a sovereign who had just been defeated by the British, sought their protection by signing the Treaty of Allahabad in the year 1765. Shah Alam II was forced to grant the Diwani (right to collect revenue) of Bengal (which included Bihar and Odisha) to the East India Company in return for an annual tribute of 2.6 million rupees to be paid by the company from the collected revenue. Tax exempt status was also restored to the company. The company further secured for the districts of Kora and Allahabad which allowed the East India Company to collect tax from more than 20 million people. East India Company thus became the Imperial tax collector in the former Mughal province of Bengal (which included Bihar and Northern Odisha). East India Company appointed a deputy Nawab Muhammad Reza Khan to collect revenue on behalf of the company.

Absence from Delhi

Shah Alam II's absence from Delhi was due to the terms of the treaty he had signed with the British. But his son and heir apparent Prince Mirza Jawan Bakht and Najib-ul-Daula, represented the emperor for the next 12 years in Delhi.

Bengal Famine
The Bengal Famine in 1770 was a massive catastrophe that signalled the end of the Mughal Empire and disorder in the Indian Subcontinent.

By the time the famine occurred it became very clear that the Mughal Empire was no longer a major political power, not only in the general world but also within South Asia.

Return to Delhi

Shah Alam II resided in the fort of Allahabad for six years. Warren Hastings, the head of East India Company got appointed as the first Governor of Bengal in 1774. This was the period of "Dual rule" where East India Company enacted laws to maximise collection of revenue and the Mughal Emperor appointed Nawab looked after other affairs of the province. East India Company later discontinued the tribute of 2.6 million Rupees and later also handed over the districts of Allahabad and Kora to the Nawab of Awadh. These measures amounted to a repudiation of the company's vassalage to the emperor as Diwan (tax collector). In 1793 East India Company was strong enough and abolished Nizamat (local rule) completely and annexed Bengal. Weakened Shah Alam II agreed to the consultation of the East India Company, who advised him never to trust the Marathas.

In the year 1771 the Marathas under Mahadaji Shinde returned to northern India and even captured Delhi. Shah Alam II, was escorted by Mahadaji Shinde and left Allahabad in May 1771 and in January 1772 reached Delhi. Along with the Marathas they undertook to win the crown lands of Rohilkhand and defeated Zabita Khan, capturing the fort of Pathargarh with its treasure.

The emperor returned to the throne in Delhi in 1772, under the protection of the Maratha general Mahadaji Shinde. The emperor became a client of the Maratha whose Peshwa demanded tribute, which the Moguls are known to have paid so as to avoid any further conflict with the Confederacy.

In the year 1787, an embassy of Vijay Singh from Jodhpur presented itself to the Mughal Emperor Shah Alam II, bringing homage and the golden key of the Fortress of Ajmer.

After killing Ghulam Qadir and restoring Shah Alam II to the throne, a Maratha garrison permanently occupied Delhi in 1788 and ruled on north India for next two decades until they were usurped by the East India Company in the Second Anglo-Maratha War.

Reformation of the Mughal Army

One of his first acts was to strengthen and raise a new Mughal Army, under the command of Mirza Najaf Khan. This new army consisted of infantrymen who successfully utilised both Flintlocks and Talwars in combat formations, they used elephants for transportation and were less dependent on artillery and cavalry. Mirza Najaf Khan is also known to have introduced the more-effective Firelock muskets through his collaboration with Mir Qasim, the Nawab of Bengal.

Foreign relations

Shah Alam II, was well supported by Jean Law de Lauriston and 200 Frenchmen during his campaign to regain the Eastern Subahs (during the Seven Years' War). The brainchild of the campaign was Ghulam Husain Tabatabai, who had gained much administrative and military experience from both the French and the Dutch.

After Shah Alam II's defeat in the Battle of Buxar, the French once again reached out to emperor under Pierre André de Suffren in the year 1781, who initiated a plan to capture Bombay and Surat from the Maratha Confederacy and the British, with the co-operation of Mirza Najaf Khan, this action would eventually lead to Asaf Jah II to join Shah Alam II and the French and assist Hyder Ali to capture Madras from the East India Company. The internal conflicts within the Mughal imperial court would not allow the emperor to make such a bold move against the British.

Jat victories

Jats rose in retaliation of religious intolerance pursued by Aurangzeb. The Jat kingdom of Bharatpur waged many wars against the Mughal Delhi and in the 17th and 18th century carried out numerous campaigns in Mughal territories including Agra. Mughals were defeated by Marathas in 1757; and Mughal possessions and territories were under the annexation of the Jats led by Suraj Mal.

During one massive assault, Jats sieged Agra in 1761, after 20 days on 12 June 1761 the Mughal forces at Agra surrendered to Jats. Jats plundered the city and carried the bounty, including the two great silver doors to the entrance of the famous Taj Mahal. which were carried off and melted down by Suraj Mal in 1764.

Suraj Mal's son Jawahar Singh, further extended the Jat power in Northern India and captured the territory in Doab, Ballabgarh and Agra. Jats kept Agra fort and other territories closer to Delhi under their control from 1761 till 1774 CE.

Sikh Victories

Sikhs had been in perpetual war against Mughal intolerance specially after beheading of the Sikh Guru - Guru Teg Bahadur by the Mughals. Simmering Sikhs rose once again in the year 1764 and overran the Mughal Faujdar of Sirhind, Zain Khan Sirhindi, who fell in battle and ever since the Sikhs perpetually raided and took the bounties from the lands as far as Delhi practically every year.

The Marathas took Delhi in 1771 before Shah Alam II arrived. Mirza Najaf Khan had restored a sense of order to the Mughal finances and administration and particularly reformed the Mughal Army. In 1777 Mirza Najaf Khan decisively defeated Zabita Khan's forces and repelled the Sikhs after halting their raids.

In 1778, after a Sikh incursion into Delhi, Shah Alam ordered their defeat by appointing, the Mughal Grand Vizier, Majad-ud-Daula marched with 20,000 Mughal troops against the Sikh army into hostile territories, this action led to the defeat of the Mughal Army at Muzzaffargarh and later at Ghanaur, due to the mounted casualties Shah Alam II reappointed Mirza Najaf Khan, who soon died of natural circumstances leaving the Mughal Empire weaker than ever.

In the year 1779, Mirza Najaf Khan carefully advanced his forces who successfully routed the treasonous Zabita Khan and his Sikh allies who lost more than 5,000 men in a single battle and never returned to threaten the Mughal Empire during the commander Mirza Najaf Khan's lifetime. Najaf Khan as prime minister, granted sovereign rights to the Sikhs as agreement.

In the year 1783, Farzana Zeb un-Nissa had saved Delhi from a possible invasion by a force of 30,000 Sikh troops, under Baghel Singh, Jassa Singh Ramgarhia and Jassa Singh Ahluwalia.

Mughal empire disintegrated to such an extent that Shah Alam II was only left with Delhi city to rule. In 1783, Jassa Singh Ahluwalia and Baghel Singh laid siege to the city. After entering Red fort, Jassa Singh Ahluwalia sat on the Mughal throne on behest of Baghel Singh and a title of Badshah Singh was given to him. Begum Samru requested Baghel Singh to show mercy on Shah Alam II. Baghel Singh accepted and stated his demands such as 30,000 of his troops to stay in Delhi and the Mughal Empire would pay for their maintenance. Other demands were the construction of at least 5 Gurdwaras and annual tax payment of 13.5%. The demands were agreed upon by Shah Alam II with a written agreement. Since Sikhs refused to accept authority of the Mughal court due to politics, Mahadji Shinde was given the regency with an agreement that Sikhs will not plunder the crown lands and they will be paid 1/3 of the Delhi revenue annually instead.

Downfall

After the defeats at Muzaffargarh and later at Ghanaur, Majad-ud-Daula was arrested by the orders of Shah Alam II, who then recalled Mirza Najaf Khan. This led to the former Grand Vizier's arrest for causing miscalculations and collaborating with the enemies of the emperor. The traitor was imprisoned and a sum of two million dam in stolen revenue recovered from him. It was Shah Alam II's poor judgement and vacillation that led to his own downfall. Mirza Najaf Khan had given the Mughal Empire breathing space by having a powerful, well managed army in its own right. In 1779 the newly reformed Mughal Army decisively defeated Zabita Khan, the rebels lost 5,000 men including their leader and therefore did not return during the lifetime of Mirza Najaf Khan . Unfortunately upon the general's death, Shah Alam's bad judgement prevailed. The dead man's nephew, Mirza Shafi whose valour had been proven during various occasions, was not appointed commander in chief. Shah Alam II instead appointed worthless individuals whose loyalty and record were questionable at best . They were soon quarrelling over petty matters. Even the corrupt and treasonous former Grand Vizier, Majad-ud-Daula was restored to his former office, he later colluded with the Sikhs and reduced the size of the Mughal Army from over 20,000 to only 5,000 thus bringing the Mughal Emperor Shah Alam II at the mercy of his enemies.

Prisoner of Ghulam Qadir
Nawab Majad-ud-Daula was followed by a known enemy of the Mughals, the grandson of Najib Khan, Ghulam Qadir, with his Sikh allies forced Shah Alam II to appoint him as the Grand Vizier of the Mughal Empire. Ghulam Qadir ravaged the palaces in search of the Mughal treasure believed to be worth Rs. 250 million. Unable to locate such a sum and angered by the Mughal Emperor's attempts to eliminate him and his Sikh allies, Ghulam Qadir himself blinded Shah Alam II with an Afghani knife on 10 August 1788. Ghulam Qadir behaved with brutality to the emperor and his family. Three servants and two water-carriers who tried to help the bleeding emperor were beheaded and according to one account, Ghulam Qadir would pull the beard of the elderly Mughal Emperor. After ten weeks, during which Ghulam Qadir stripped the princesses of the royal family naked and forced them to dance naked before him (after which they jumped into Yamuna river to drown) and the honour of the royal family and prestige of the Mughal Empire reached its lowest ebb, Mahadaji Shinde intervened and killed Ghulam Qadir, taking possession of Delhi on 2 October 1788. He restored Shah Alam II to the throne and acted as his protector. Mahadaji Shinde sent the ears and eyes of Ghulam Qadir to Shah Alam.

Client of Mahadji Shinde
Thankful for his intervention, he honoured Mahadji Shinde with the titles of Vakil-ul-Mutlaq (Regent of the Empire) and Amir-ul-Amara (Head of the Amirs). He made a deal with the Peshwa granting tribute to Pune in return for the protection provided Mahadji Shinde of the Maratha Confederacy.

After killing Ghulam Qadir and restoring Shah Alam II to the throne, a Maratha garrison permanently occupied Delhi in 1788 and ruled on north India for next two decades until they were usurped by the East India Company following the Second Anglo-Maratha War in 1803.

Arrival of British troops

The French threat in Europe and its possible repercussions in India caused the British to strive to regain the custody of Shah Alam II. The British feared that the French military officers might overthrow Maratha power and use the authority of the Mughal emperor to further French ambition in India.

Shah Alam II also corresponded with Hyder Ali and later with his son Tipu Sultan during their conflicts with the East India Company during the Anglo-Mysore Wars and was very well informed about the expansionist agenda of the British.

After the Battle of Delhi (1803), during the Second Anglo-Maratha War, on 14 September 1803 British troops entered Delhi ending the Maratha rule on the Mughals, bringing Shah Alam, then a blind old man, seated under a tattered canopy, under British protection. The Mughal Emperor no longer had the military power to enforce his will, but he commanded respect as a dignified member of the House of Timur in the length and breadth of the country. The Nawabs and Subedars still sought formal sanction of the Mughal Emperor on their accession and valued the titles he bestowed upon them. They struck coins and read the khutba (Friday sermons) in his name. The Marathas in 1804 under Yashwantrao Holkar tried to snatch Delhi from the British in Siege of Delhi (1804), but failed.

Death

Shah Alam II died of natural causes on 19 November 1806.

His grave lies in a marble enclosure adjoined to the Moti Masjid, next to the dargah of the 13th century Sufi saint Qutbuddin Bakhtiar Kaki, in Mehrauli, Delhi. Also in the enclosure are the tombs of Bahadur Shah I (also known as Shah Alam I), and Akbar Shah II.

In popular culture
 In the 1994 Hindi TV series The Great Maratha, Shah Alam's character was portrayed by Rishabh Shukla.

Gallery

See also

Mirza Najaf Khan
Shuja-ud-Daula
Hyder Ali
Muhammed Ali Khan Wallajah

References

 
Shah Alam II (1728–1806)
The Fall of the Moghul Empire of Hindustan – World Wide School
Marathas and the English Company 1707–1800

Further reading
 

Mughal emperors
1728 births
1806 deaths
18th-century Indian monarchs
People from Delhi